Events from the year 1547 in Ireland.

Incumbent
Monarch: Henry VIII (until 28 January), then Edward VI

Events
January 28 – Edward VI becomes King of England and Ireland upon the death of Henry VIII; start of Edwardian Reformation in Ireland (lasting until 1553).
Summer – Patrick O'More and Brian O'Connor ravage Kildare but are driven back by Sir Edward Bellingham, ordered to Ireland in late May to restore order.
Athlone Castle is reconstructed by Sir William Brabazon.

Births
Richard Stanihurst, translator, poet and historian (d. 1618)

Deaths
January 28 – Henry VIII, King of Ireland (b. 1491)

References

 
1540s in Ireland
Ireland
Years of the 16th century in Ireland